Jacob Hook (born 21 August 2002) is a speedway rider from Australia.

Speedway career 
Hook began riding at the North Brisbane Junior Motorcycle Club and impressed in Australian junior racing. He began his British speedway career riding for the Edinburgh Monarchs in the SGB Championship 2022. Hook's 2020 & 2021 seasons were disrupted by the COVID-19 pandemic before he joined the Monarchs.

In 2023, he re-signed for Edinburgh in the SGB Championship 2023 and also signed for Edinburgh's NDL academy side.

References 

Living people
2002 births
Australian speedway riders
Edinburgh Monarchs riders